Gypsophila elegans, the annual baby's-breath or showy baby's-breath, is an ornamental plant native to Asia and Europe.

References

elegans
Flora of Asia
Flora of Europe
Garden plants